Potentilla atrosanguinea, the dark crimson cinquefoil, Himalayan cinquefoil, or ruby cinquefoil, is a species of Potentilla found in Bhutan and India.

References

External links
 
 

atrosanguinea